Boldyrevka is a rural locality (a selo) and the administrative center of Boldyrevskoye Rural Settlement, Ostrogozhsky District, Voronezh Oblast, Russia. The population was 496 as of 2010. There are 7 streets.

Geography 
Boldyrevka is located 35 km north of Ostrogozhsk (the district's administrative centre) by road. Novo-Uspenka is the nearest rural locality.

References 

Rural localities in Ostrogozhsky District